The sieur de Sauvolle (1701), known for certainty only by his surname, was the first governor of the French territory of Louisiana. He accompanied the brothers Iberville and Bienville on their first voyage to Louisiana in 1699 and their explorations inland. On May 2, 1699, he was appointed commander of the new Fort Maurepas, and in January 1700 he became the territory's governor. His journal is one of the earliest sources for the history of the region. Sauvolle died suddenly, likely from yellow fever, on August 21, 1701.

Despite the survival of his journal entries and the journals of Iberville, almost nothing is known about Sauvolle: neither his ancestry nor the year of his birth, nor even much of his name. Iberville mentions him as "M. de Sauvolle". Statements by various historians that his first name was Antoine or François-Marie, that he was the sieur de la Villantry, or that he was a brother of Iberville and Bienville are assertions not supported by multiple sources.

Notes

External links

  (a somewhat romanticized account)
 

Governors of Louisiana (New France)
Year of birth uncertain
1701 deaths